WMSTR, or the Western Minnesota Steam Threshers Reunion, is an annual, non-profit "steam meet" held in the small town of Rollag, Minnesota. It takes place over the weekend of the US Labor Day holiday (first Monday in September), and draws around 80,000 visitors during the four days of the event.

Beginning in 1954, the reunion has grown from a few farmers threshing grain, as their fathers had, to one of the largest steam venues in the nation. Antique and steam tractors and automobiles are featured.

Attractions 

WMSTR is a living museum and as such, all exhibits are expected to be operable. 
One of the most popular, visible, and amazing attractions is the SOO LINE 0-6-0 class switch engine #353 which pulls a 500-passenger train around the show grounds. Also present is a miniature train, two full-size steam-operated sawmills, the larger called the Briden-Roen Sawmill after its builders and the smaller mill called Earl's Mill. Other main attractions include the steam hammer, the giant Snow Engine, which has an approximately 24 foot flywheel, and an area very popular with children, Miniatureland, which holds several hand-built miniature steam tractors and its own miniature sawmill that saws walking sticks for all the visitors who would like one. On the WMSTR grounds, there are several areas devoted to different types of machinery. There are gas engine buildings, a horsepower area, a construction area, and an expo ground. Several hundred tractors are put on display by the workers. In about the last decade, the Main Street area has grown as an attraction for many of those more interested in the everyday aspects of the past. Main Street has many buildings and demonstrations showing what daily life was like in times past.

Common names 
To most locals, the reunion is known by several names. "Rollag", "Steamer Hill", "WMSTR" or simply "The Hill."

Gunderson Pond 
Gunderson Pond is the pond located in the center of the grounds. It also has its own "Pond Monster," a likeness of the Loch Ness Monster floating in the middle of the pond.

Steamer Hill
Every day during the Reunion, at 10am and 2pm, Steamer Hill hosts a parade consisting of all sorts of machinery, from old cars to the giant steam-powered tractors. The Nelson crew does the whistle calls.

See also

Otto engine
Steam hammer
Rollag, Minnesota
Soo Line 353

External links
Rollag Home Page
Western Minnesota Steam Threshers Reunion Facebook Page Facebook
Aerial view of the showgrounds
WMSTR Google Map
Steam Threshing & Trains Documentary produced by Pioneer Public Television
Rollag - Western Minnesota Steam Threshers Reunion YouTube

Threshermen's Reunions
Tourist attractions in Clay County, Minnesota
Festivals in Minnesota
Steam museums in the United States
1954 establishments in Minnesota
Recurring events established in 1954